The 2010 Open Castilla y León was a professional tennis tournament played on outdoor hard courts. It was the twenty fifth edition of the tournament which was part of the Tretorn SERIE+ of the 2010 ATP Challenger Tour. It took place in Segovia, Spain between 2 and 8 August 2010.

ATP entrants

Seeds

 Rankings are as of July 26, 2010.

Other entrants
The following players received wildcards into the singles main draw:
  Gerard Granollers-Pujol
  Sergio Gutiérrez-Ferrol
  Jorge Hernando Ruano
  Javier Martí

The following players received entry from the qualifying draw:
  Tomáš Cakl
  Chris Eaton
  Abraham González-Jiménez
  Michael Ryderstedt

Champions

Singles

 Daniel Gimeno-Traver def.  Adrian Mannarino, 6–4, 7–6(2)

Doubles

 Thiago Alves /  Franco Ferreiro def.  Brian Battistone /  Harsh Mankad, 6–2, 5–7, [10–8]

External links
Official website
ITF Search 
2010 Draws

 
Cas
Castilla y Leon
Open Castilla y Leon
Open Castilla y León